Green Stadium may refer to: 
 Green Stadium, Awendo – A stadium in Awendo, Kenya, where Sony Sugar play their home matches
 Green Stadium, Kericho – A stadium in Kericho, Kenya, where Zoo Kericho play their home matches
 Green Stadium, Nazareth Illit – A stadium in Nazareth Illit, Israel, formerly occupied by Hapoel Acre and Hapoel Nazareth Illit
 Green Venice Stadium – a stadium under construction in Venice, Italy, also known as Green Venice Arena